Bobo of San Teodoro (died 9 October 1199) was an Italian cardinal.

He was relative of Pope Celestine III, who named him cardinal-deacon of San Teodoro on 20 February 1193. He subscribed papal bulls between 4 March 1193 and 19 June 1199. His death is recorded in the necrology of the Vatican Basilica, of which he was canon before his promotion to the cardinalate.

Sources
  Maleczek, Werner, 1984: Papst und Kardinalskolleg von 1191 bis 1216, p. 111. Vienna

12th-century Italian cardinals
Cardinal-nephews
1199 deaths
Year of birth unknown